The Landgraviate of Hesse-Kassel, spelled Hesse-Cassel during its entire existence, was a state in the Holy Roman Empire that was directly subject to the Emperor. The state was created in 1567 when the Landgraviate of Hesse was divided upon the death of Philip I, Landgrave of Hesse. His eldest son William IV inherited the northern half of the Landgraviate and the capital of Kassel. The other sons received the Landgraviate of Hesse-Marburg, the Landgraviate of Hesse-Rheinfels and the Landgraviate of Hesse-Darmstadt.

During the Napoleonic reorganisation of the Empire in 1803, the Landgrave of Hesse-Kassel was elevated to an Electorate and Landgrave William IX became an Imperial Elector. Many members of the Hesse-Kassel House served in the Danish military gaining high ranks and power in the Oldenburg realm due to the fact that many Landgraves were married to Danish princesses. Members of the family who are known to have served Denmark-Norway include Prince Frederik of Hesse-Kassel, Prince Frederick of Hesse-Kassel, and Prince Charles of Hesse-Kassel. It had two votes to the Reichstag: one for itself and one for Hersfeld Abbey. It was later occupied by French troops and became part of the Kingdom of Westphalia, a French satellite state. The Electorate of Hesse was restored at the end of the Napoleonic Wars, though by that time there was no longer an emperor to elect.

History 

The Landgraviate of Hesse-Kassel was founded by William IV the Wise, the eldest son of Philip I. On his father's death in 1567, the Landgraviate of Hesse was divided into four parts.  William IV received about half of the territory, with Kassel as his capital. Hesse-Kassel expanded in 1604 when Maurice, Landgrave of Hesse-Kassel inherited the Landgraviate of Hesse-Marburg from his childless uncle, Louis IV, Landgrave of Hesse-Marburg (1537–1604).

Thirty Years' War 

In 1605, Maurice became Calvinist and entered the Thirty Years' War on the Protestant side. After being forced to cede some of his territories to Hesse-Darmstadt, Maurice abdicated in 1627 in favour of his son William V. His younger sons received appanages, which created several cadet lines in yet another partition of Hesse. William V allied himself with Gustavus Adolphus of Sweden and then France, losing most of Hesse-Kassel when Imperial troops invaded. He died in exile in 1637, leaving his widow Amalie Elisabeth of Hanau-Münzenberg to act as regent for their eight-year-old son William VI.

Amalie Elisabeth vigorously advanced the interests of Hesse-Kassel. After expelling Imperial troops from Hesse-Kassel, she sent troops to take the city of Marburg, which her father-in-law had lost to their Hesse-Darmstadt relatives. At the Peace of Westphalia in 1648, Hesse-Kassel was further rewarded with most of the County of Schaumburg and the newly secularized Hersfeld Abbey.  Amalie Elisabeth also introduced the rule of primogeniture to prevent Hesse-Kasse from being divided again in the future.  However, her health was ruined by the stresses of the war, and she died in 1651.

17th and 18th centuries 

William VI, who came of age in 1650, was an enlightened patron of learning and the arts. He was succeeded by his son William VII, Landgrave of Hesse-Kassel, then an infant, who died in 1670. He was succeeded by his brother Charles I. Charles' chief claim to fame is that he hired out his soldiers to foreign powers as auxiliaries, as a means of improving the finances of his principality. William V was succeeded by Landgraves William VI and William VII. Frederick I of Sweden, the next landgrave, became by marriage King of Sweden. Although the Landgraviate was in personal union with Sweden from 1730 to 1751, the King's younger brother, Prince William, ruled in Kassel as regent until he succeeded his brother as William VIII.

On Frederick I's death in 1751, he was succeeded by his brother William VIII, who fought as an ally of Kingdom of Great Britain during the Seven Years' War. His successor, Frederick II, converted to Catholicism after a long line of Protestant Landgraviates. When the American Revolutionary War broke out, Frederick II leased Hessian troops to Great Britain for service in America.

End of the landgraviate 

Following the reorganization of the German states during the German mediatisation of 1803, the Landgraviate of Hesse-Kassel was raised to the Electorate of Hesse and Landgrave William IX was elevated to Imperial Elector, taking the title William I, Elector of Hesse.

In 1806, William I was dispossessed by Napoleon Bonaparte for his support of the Kingdom of Prussia. Kassel was designated as the capital of a new Kingdom of Westphalia, where Napoleon appointed his brother Jérôme Bonaparte as king. Following Napoleon's defeat in 1813, the elector was restored. At the Congress of Vienna, a number of Napoleonic electorates were elevated to kingdoms, and William tried to secure recognition as King of the Chatti. However, he was rebuffed by the Great Powers, who listed him as a "Royal Highness" along with the other grand dukes. To secure his pre-eminence over his cousin, the Grand Duke of Hesse in the former Hesse-Darmstadt, William chose to keep his title of Prince-Elector. The rulers of the Electorate of Hesse became the only Prince-Electors in the German Confederation, even though there was no longer a Holy Roman Emperor for them to elect.

Hessian troops in foreign service 

The Landgraves of Hesse-Kassel were famous for renting out their army to European Great Powers during the 17th and 18th centuries. It was a widespread practice at the time for small countries to rent out troops to larger countries in exchange for subsidies. International jurists drew a distinction between mercenaries and auxiliaries (Hilfstruppen). Mercenaries served in foreign armies as individuals, while auxiliaries were sent by their prince to the aid of another prince.

Hesse-Kassel took the practice to an extreme, maintaining 5.3% of its population under arms in 1730. This was a higher proportion than even Prussia, a country that was so heavily militarized that it was described as "not a country with an army, but an army with a country". The Hessian army served as a readily available reserve for the Great Powers.

During the American War of Independence, 25% of the British army consisted of troops rented from German princes, half of whom came from Hesse-Kassel and nearby Hesse-Hanau. For this reason, Americans refer to all German troops serving with the British army as "Hessians", a form of synecdoche.

Namesakes 

The village of Hessen Cassel, Indiana, near Fort Wayne, founded by German immigrants, is named for the Landgraviate of Hesse-Kassel.

See also 
 New Netherland
 New Sweden
 Pennsylvania Dutch
 Rulers of Hesse

Notes

References

External links 

 Hoeckmann.de: Map of Hesse (Northern part) — in 1789
 Hoeckmann.de: Map of Hesse (Southern part) — in 1789

Landgraviate of Hesse-Kassel
Early Modern history of Germany
Counties of the Holy Roman Empire
 
States and territories established in 1567
States and territories disestablished in 1803
1567 establishments in the Holy Roman Empire
1803 disestablishments in the Holy Roman Empire
Hesse-Kassel, Landgraviate of
North Hesse
Former monarchies of Europe